Sponge cake is a light cake made with egg whites, flour and sugar, sometimes leavened with baking powder. Some sponge cakes do not contain egg yolks, like angel food cake, but most of them do. Sponge cakes, leavened with beaten eggs, originated during the Renaissance, possibly in Spain. The sponge cake is thought to be one of the first of the non-yeasted cakes, and the earliest attested sponge cake recipe in English is found in a book by the English poet Gervase Markham, The English Huswife, Containing the Inward and Outward Virtues Which Ought to Be in a Complete Woman (1615). Still, the cake was much more like a cracker: thin and crispy. Sponge cakes became the cake recognized today when bakers started using beaten eggs as a rising agent in the mid-18th century. The Victorian creation of baking powder by English food manufacturer Alfred Bird in 1843 allowed the addition of butter to the traditional sponge recipe, resulting in the creation of the Victoria sponge. Cakes are available in millions of flavours and have many recipes as well. Sponge cakes have become snack cakes via the Twinkie.

History

Background
The earliest known recipe for sponge cake (or biscuit bread) from Gervase Markham's The English Huswife (1615) is prepared by mixing flour and sugar into eggs, then seasoning with anise and coriander seeds. 19th-century descriptions of "avral bread" (funeral biscuits) vary from place to place but it sometimes described as "sponge biscuits" or a "crisp sponge" with a light dusting of sugar". Traditional American sponge recipes diverged from earlier methods of preparation, adding ingredients like vinegar, baking powder, hot water or milk. 
The basic recipe is also used for madeleines, ladyfingers, and trifles, as well as some versions of strawberry shortcake.

Although sponge cake is usually made without butter, its flavor is often enhanced with buttercream, pastry cream or other types of fillings and frostings. Sponge soaks up flavors from fresh fruits, fillings and custard sauces. Sponge cake covered in boiled icing was very popular in American cuisine during the 1920s and 1930s. The delicate texture of sponge and angel food cakes, and the difficulty of their preparation, meant these cakes were more expensive than daily staple pies. The historic Frances Virginia Tea Room in Atlanta served sponge cake with lemon filling and boiled icing. New York City's Crumperie served not only crumpets but toasted sponge cake as well.

Methods of preparation 

The basic whisked sponge cake does not contain any fat. It is made by whisking egg whites and caster sugar and gently folding in flour. The process of whisking egg whites incorporates air bubbles to create a foam by agitating the protein albumen to create a partially coagulated membrane, making the egg whites stiffer and increasing their volume. This type of cake, also called foam cake, depends on aeration of eggs and heat to rise. Some types of sponge are baked in ungreased pans to improve the cake's rise by allowing the batter to adhere and climb the sides of the pan. To maintain the moisture of the cake it is sometimes made with potato flour.

Variations on the basic sponge sometimes add butter or egg yolks to make the cake more moist. For Genoise cake flour and melted butter are added to the egg mixture for a moister cake. The "biscuit" sponge from early American cuisine is made by beating egg yolks with sugar, then alternately folding in whisked egg whites and flour. Anne Willan says both types of sponge cake are represented in French cuisine. According to Willan "sponge may have some butter added, but not much or it will not rise". Cream of tartar or baking soda are recommended by some turn of the century cookbooks to make Swiss rolls more pliable and easier to roll.

For some cakes, like the Victoria sponge, fat and sugar are creamed before eggs and flour are incorporated into the batter, similar to pound cake. In British English layer cakes like the Victoria sponge are called "sandwich sponge". This type of buttery cake was not possible without baking powder, which was discovered by English food manufacturer Alfred Bird in 1843, allowing the sponge to rise higher.

Types

Asian

In the Philippines, sponge cakes and chiffon cakes were introduced during the Spanish period. They are typically baked as cupcakes, as loaves, or as cake rolls. Traditionally they are simply served with just butter (or margarine) and white sugar. Variants of  also use unique ingredients, the most common being purple yam and pandan leaves which result in the ube cake and the buko pandan cake.

Chinese almond sponge is steamed and topped with boiled icing, chocolate, vegetables or fresh fruit. Korean sponge called  is usually made with rice flour and topped with whipped topping and fruit. Some Vietnamese varieties may have fresh herbs like mint, lemon grass or basil added to the batter, and be topped with caramelized tropical fruit. Milk and jaggery are added to sponge cake in India which is served with the creamy Sri Lankan specialty "avocado crazy". Western style sponge cakes topped with whipped cream and strawberries are popular in Japan where sponge is also used as a base for cheesecakes.

Angel food cake

Angel food cake is a 19th-century American cake that contains no egg yolks or butter. The cake is leavened using only egg whites and baking powder. This recipe can be traced to 18th century American cookbooks. The delicate cake is baked in an ungreased pan and cooled upside down.

Boston cream pie

The official state dessert of Massachusetts, the Boston cream pie, is a chocolate-glazed, layered yellow sponge cake filled with pastry cream. It may be based on the Washington pie, originally two layers of yellow sponge cake with jam filling and a dusting of icing sugar. The first known written recipe from the 1878 Granite Iron Ware Cook Book uses baking powder for the sponge. Maria Parloa published several recipes for cream pie, includes one for chocolate cream pie. Parloa's recipe is the closest to the modern Boston Cream Pie.

Chiffon cake

Chiffon cake is a light and moist cake which, in contrast to sponge cake, contains both vegetable oil and baking powder. It is similar to angel food cake and was commonly served with grapefruit at the Brown Derby in Hollywood during the 1930s.

Genoise

The addition of butter by French pastry cooks created a cake texture that more resembled pound cake than traditional sponge cake. Techniques were developed to make the cake lighter, including beating the eggs over heat, or beating the egg yolks and whites separately.

Pan di Spagna
The  evolved from the Genoise cake as an attempt to simplify the original recipe (the preparation does not use heat or molten butter).

Joconde cake
A relative of the Genoise, the Joconde sponge cake (or Biscuit Joconde) is a thin sponge cake made with ground almonds. It can be used as a layer in a layer cake (for example an opera cake), or for decorative purposes as Joconde imprime.

Pão-de-Ló
This sponge variation from Portuguese cuisine is flavoured with lemon or orange peel. It is served plain, and day-old cake may be incorporated into other desserts like puddings. Anecdotal legends about the cake's origin associate it with a secret recipe passed down by nuns to the village of Alfeizerão. The manufacture for commercial markets began during the Portuguese Revolution of 1910. The French adopted the Italian Genovese version of the cake and called it . Introduced to Japan by Portuguese traders in the 16th century, the Japanese variations on the cake are known as castella,  or simply .

Plava
Plava is a sponge cake that is found in Jewish cuisine and usually eaten during Pesach. The batter is leavened with egg whites and frequently includes flavorings like lemon zest or almond essence.

Swiss roll
A swiss roll is a thin sponge cake that is spread with a layer of filling and rolled.

Tipsy cake
Isabella Beeton included a recipe for her version of "Tipsy Cake" in Mrs Beeton's Book of Household Management where the cake was baked in a decorative mold before it was soaked in sherry and brandy with custard poured over, or broken into smaller pieces and topped with whipped cream like trifle.

Trifle

The earliest known form of trifle was a simple thickened cream flavored with sugar, rosewater and ginger but recipes for egg-thickened custard poured over sponge fingers, almond macaroons and sack-soaked ratafia biscuits are known from the mid-18th century. In 1747 Hannah Glasse adds syllabub and currant jelly over the custard. Similar recipes are known for the same time with the sponge soaked in sherry, wine or fruit juice. Eliza Acton's recipe for "Duke's Custard" was made from custard poured over brandied cherries rolled in sugar with sponge fingers (or macaroons) and pink whipped cream. Wyvern complained that trifle "should be made to time-honored standards, and not debased into a horror of stale cake, mean jam, canned fruits, packet jelly and packet custard."

Victoria sponge

The Victoria sponge, also known as the Victoria sandwich cake, was named after Queen Victoria, who was known to enjoy the small cakes with her afternoon tea. The version Queen Victoria ate would have been filled with jam alone, but modern versions often include cream. The top of the cake is not iced or decorated apart from a dusting of powdered sugar. The recipe evolved from the classic pound cake made with equal proportions of flour, fat, sugar and eggs. The invention of baking powder in 1843 by English food manufacturer Alfred Bird allowed the cake to rise higher than was previously possible. Cookery author Felicity Cloake writes that this invention "was celebrated with a patriotic cake"—the Victoria sponge. According to Alysa Levene of Oxford Brookes University the term "sponge" is used "erroneously" for the Victoria Sandwich cake:

A Victoria sponge is made using one of two methods. The traditional method involves creaming caster sugar with fat (usually butter), mixing thoroughly with beaten egg, then folding flour and raising agent into the mixture. The modern method, using an electric mixer or food processor, involves simply whisking all the ingredients together until creamy. Additionally, the modern method typically uses an extra raising agent, and some recipes call for an extra-soft butter or margarine. This basic "cake" mixture has been made into a wide variety of treats and puddings, including cupcakes, chocolate cake, and Eve's pudding.

Religious celebrations

At Passover
Since sponge cakes are not leavened with yeast, they are popular dessert choices for the Passover feast. Typically, Passover sponges are made with matzo meal, shredded coconut, matzo flour, potato flour, or nut flour (almond, hazelnut etc.) since raw wheat products may not be used.  No raising agent may be used due to the strict prohibition of even the appearance of a leavening effect. Therefore, the beating of egg whites in the mix to achieve the aeration is an essential characteristic of any Passover sponge recipe. Many families have at least one recipe they pass down through generations, and matzo meal-based cake mixes are available commercially. Several brands are easily found in kosher stores, especially before Passover. Typical flavorings include almonds, apples, dark chocolate, lemon, pecans, and poppy seeds. Apple or orange juice is the liquid ingredient. Milk is avoided, because it cannot be included in a dessert to be served after a meat based meal. The sponge, or a heavier variant in the form of an almond pudding, may be included as an element of the dessert in the Passover meal during the Seder service, when it is often combined in serving with a fruit compote.

For Christmas
The Yule log is a Christmas dessert made from a sheet of sponge cake spread with filling and rolled up. It is topped with chocolate to give the appearance of bark. Decorative elements like mushrooms made of meringue, spun-sugar spiderwebs or crushed pistachios can be added to enhance the cake's finished appearance.

Image gallery

References

External links

British cakes
English cuisine
Jewish cuisine
American cakes
Sponge cakes
Italian cakes